The New South Wales State Masters is an annual Tenpin Bowling tournament for adults in New South Wales, Australia

The tournament is open to men and women over age 18 who are members of Tenpin Bowling Australia (TBA Limited).

Started in 2001, the matches are held at bowling centres that are registered with the TBA.

Description
Qualification for the men's and women's finals usually involve a three-game series rolled during the NSW State Championships.  The top eight to 12 bowlers, along with the reigning champion, progress to the finals stage in the Masters. 

Where there are low numbers in qualifications for any finals in any divisions, the highest qualifying scorer automatically becomes the NSW State Masters champion of that division. Masters Champions from each year are then given automatic qualification and free entry into the Australian Masters Tournament.

Past New South Wales Open Masters Champions

Classic Masters History
Although the Junior counterpart of the Classic Masters has been running for years, an adult version had not been contested until 2010. Due to low numbers, it was not seen until its re-inception in 2016.

Eligibility

 TBA Registered Players who reached the age of 18 years as at 1 January of the current year
 Entering Average does not exceed 189 for women and 199 for men
 Participants who have completed an all-events entry in the NSW State Championships before the final

Information

 Scratch event with two divisions; Male and Female
 Top eight  contestants in each division from qualifying, including the Defending Champion (if eligible) contest the Adult Classic Cup Final

Qualifying

 Qualifying can take place in singles and doubles events of the State Championships
 Bowlers may attempt to qualify more than once

Final

 Bowlers will contest eight games with a lane change after each game
 The top two males and females on scratch pinfall after the eight  games will contest a two-game aggregate final with the bowler with the highest pinfall of this two-game match being declared the NSW Adult Classic Cup Champion

Past New South Wales Classic Masters Champions

References

External links
 Tenpin Bowling New South Wales - Masters Winners
 2017 NSW Adult Classic Cup
 2017 NSW Adult Restricted Masters
 2017 Seniors Masters
 2017 NSW Adult Open Masters

Sport in New South Wales
Ten-pin bowling in Australia
Ten-pin bowling competitions